The Constitution of the Italian Republic, was the constitution of the Italian Republic, a client republic of France under Napoleon Bonaparte, roughly comprising the modern-day northern regions of Lombardy and Emilia-Romagna. It came into effect on 26 January 1802.

See also
Statuto Albertino
Constitution of Italy
Constitutional Statute of Italy

External links
 Text of the Constitution 

Law of Italy
1802 in Italy
1802 in law
Constitution of Italy
1802 documents